"Baby When the Light" is a song by French DJ David Guetta. It was released on 10 November 2007 as the third single from his third studio album, Pop Life. The song features vocals by singer Cozi Costi. It was written by Guetta and singer-songwriter Cathy Dennis, whose previous hits include "Touch Me (All Night Long)" as well as co-writing numerous dance-pop songs such as Kylie Minogue’s "Can't Get You Out of My Head" and Britney Spears' "Toxic".

Music video
The "Baby When the Light" music video is about a young girl, played by model Kelly Thiebaud, who goes to the beach and dreams about befriending a handsome surfer. While walking her dog, she decides to rest on the beach where she starts dreaming. As the video proceeds, strange things start to happen, girls in bikinis start dancing, an old woman starts rubbing herself with lotion as she watches the young surfer via binoculars. Close to the end of the video, the woman is finally approached by the surfer after exchanging smiles throughout the video. He then invites her to surf with him. The video ends as the girl wakes up from her dream, and finds no one around her but her dog. The video was filmed on a beach near Los Angeles, California.

Track listings

 UK CD single
 "Baby When the Light" (David Guetta & Fred Rister Radio Edit) – 3:15
 "Baby When the Light" (Laidback Luke Remix) – 7:09
 "Baby When the Light" (Dirty South Remix) – 6:34
 "Baby When the Light" (Joe T. Vanelli Remix) – 6:45

 French CD single
 "Baby When the Light" (album version) – 3:27
 "Baby When the Light" (David Guetta & Fred Rister Radio Edit) – 3:24
 "Baby When the Light" (original extended mix) – 5:58
 "Baby When the Light" (video) – 3:27
 "Baby When the Light" (Making of the Video) – 3:11
					
 German CD single
 "Baby When the Light" (David Guetta & Fred Rister Remix) – 8:17
 "Baby When the Light" (Laidback Luke Remix) – 7:09
 "Baby When the Light" (Dirty South Remix) – 6:34
 "Baby When the Light" (Joe T. Vanelli Remix) – 6:45
 "Baby When the Light" (Original Extended Mix) – 5:58
 "Baby When the Light" (David Guetta & Fred Rister Radio Edit) – 3:15
 "Baby When the Light" (album version) – 3:27

Charts and certifications

Weekly charts

Year-end charts

Certifications

References

External links
 'Making Of' video

2007 singles
2007 songs
David Guetta songs
EMI Records singles
Song recordings produced by David Guetta
Songs written by Cathy Dennis
Songs written by David Guetta
Songs written by Joachim Garraud
Songs written by Steve Angello